Naked cuticle 1 (NKD1) is a human gene that encodes the protein Nkd1, a member of the Naked cuticle (Nkd) family of proteins that regulate the Wnt signaling pathway.  Insects typically have a single Nkd gene, whereas there are two Nkd genes, Nkd1 and Nkd2, in most vertebrates studied to date (zebrafish appear to have additional homologous genes such as Nkd3).  Nkd1 binds to the Dishevelled (Dvl) family of proteins (DVL1, DVL2, DVL3).  Specific truncating NKD1 mutations identified in DNA mismatch repair deficient colon cancer that disrupt Nkd1/Dvl binding implicate these mutations as a cause of increased Wnt signaling in approximately 1% of human colon cancer, the majority of which have increased Wnt signaling due to mutations the adenomatous polyposis coli (APC), AXIN2, or rarely the beta-catenin genes.

Sources 

Human proteins